Qalhar (also Romanized as Qālhar; also known as Ghalhar, Golhar, Gulehār, and Kūlhār) is a village in Hastijan Rural District, in the Central District of Delijan County, Markazi Province, Iran. At the 2015 census, its population was 618, in 229 families.

References 

Populated places in Delijan County